Diploglottis harpullioides, commonly known as Babinda tamarind, is a rainforest tree in the family Sapindaceae which is endemic to the Wet Tropics of Queensland.

Gallery

References

External links
 
 
 View a map of historical sightings of this species at the Australasian Virtual Herbarium
 View observations of this species on iNaturalist
 View images of this species on Flickriver

harpullioides
Endemic flora of Queensland
Taxa named by Sally T. Reynolds
Taxa described in 1981
Sapindales of Australia